Cleveland Arena was an arena in Cleveland, Ohio. It was built and privately financed by local businessman Albert C. Sutphin during the height of the Great Depression in 1937 as a playing site for Sutphin's AHL team, the Cleveland Barons. The arena was at 3717 Euclid Avenue, and seated over 10,000 in the stands and over 12,500 for events such as boxing, where floor seating was available.

In addition to the Barons, the arena was home to the Cleveland Rebels of the Basketball Association of America, also owned by Sutphin, for the 1946–47 season, and hosted several games for the Cincinnati Royals of the National Basketball Association (NBA), who played more than 35 of their home games there from 1966–1970. The arena and the Barons were purchased by Nick Mileti in 1968. In 1970, the expansion Cleveland Cavaliers of the NBA moved into the arena and played there for their first four seasons, from 1970–1974. The Cleveland Crusaders of the new World Hockey Association began play in 1972, hosting games there until 1974.

Cleveland Arena was also a regular concert and boxing venue and six day bicycle races were held there between 1939 and 1958, moved there from Public Hall. On March 21, 1952, it was the site of the Moondog Coronation Ball, considered the first rock and roll concert, organized by Alan Freed. The concert was shut down after the first song by fire authorities due to overcrowding.  It was estimated 20,000 people were in the arena or trying to enter it, when the capacity was roughly half that.

The arena also had a medical facility, Arena Clinic, run by Ivan Lust.  It was run primarily to provide medical care for visiting athletic teams and other entertainment, but also served as a walk-in clinic for the community. Its sign can be seen in photographs of the clinic.
 
While the arena was a showpiece when it opened, by the 1970s it had become decrepit. It also lacked adequate parking. It closed in 1974, replaced by Richfield Coliseum; it was demolished in 1977.  The headquarters of the Cleveland Chapter of the American Red Cross now occupies the site. It was the last major sporting facility to open within Cleveland's borders until Jacobs Field, now Progressive Field, opened for the Cleveland Guardians in 1994.

References

External links
Cleveland Arena (Encyclopedia of Cleveland History)
Arenas by Munsey & Suppes

Sports venues demolished in 1977
Sports venues in Cleveland
History of Cleveland
Defunct basketball venues in the United States
Defunct indoor arenas in Ohio
Indoor ice hockey venues in the United States
Basketball venues in Ohio
Cleveland Barons (1937–1973)
Cleveland Rebels
Cleveland Cavaliers venues
Cleveland White Horses
National Basketball League (United States) venues
World Hockey Association venues
Basketball Association of America venues
Sports venues completed in 1937
Music venues in Cleveland
Defunct sports venues in Ohio
Demolished music venues in the United States
1937 establishments in Ohio
1977 disestablishments in Ohio
Demolished sports venues in Ohio